Sigil is an American comic book series published by Cross Gen Entertainment from July 2000 to December 2003, ending at issue forty-two. Sigil was one of the publisher's first four titles (the others are Mystic, Scion, and Meridian), originally created by Mark Alessi and Gina M. Villa. The book is one of many from the publisher that took place in the Sigilverse, or the Cross Generation universe.

In 2011, Sigil was part of Marvel Comics' relaunch of the Cross Generation Universe.

Setting
The bulk of Sigil takes place on and around the worlds of the Planetary Union, a group of five human-inhabited planets: Gaia (believed to be humanity's home world), Brejhur, Delassia, Kayseecay, and Victor. Humans have also colonized the neutral world of Tanipal, which seceded from the Union sometime before the series opened. Tanipal is ruled by the Sultan Ronolo.

As the series opens, the Planetary Union has been at war with the Saurians, a starfaring race of reptilian humanoids, for several centuries. The extent of the Saurian empire remains a mystery, but we do know that Tcharun serves as its centre of power.

Plot synopsis
Samandahl "Sam" Rey was a former soldier for the Planetary Union. He and his good friend Roiya Sintor were laid off from the army due to cutbacks and became mercenaries. The pair were "vacationing" in the pleasure world of Tanipal when the series began. While on Tanipal, Sam and Roiya meet the beautiful Zanniati Oribatta and her bodyguard, an orange-eyed man named JeMerik Meer, these four would be inseparable for the rest of the series.

During that initial meeting, a Saurian assassin squad arrived looking for Sam. Sam had previously made an enemy of Tchlusarud, the youngest Saurian prince. The prince desperately wanted Sam dead.  In the ensuing fight, Sam was tackled by an odd Saurian with glowing orange eyes. The Saurian cryptically said to Sam, "You shall find them, gather them, and lead them" and branded him with a swirling red and yellow mark: the sigil. The saurian then disappeared. While Sam was distracted, one of the attacking Saurians impaled Roiya with his weapon, fatally injuring her.

The four retreated to Sam's ship, The Bitterluck, where they failed to save Roiya's life. In a fit of rage, Sam activated his sigil, destroying a large part of the city in the process.

Relaunch
Sigil was relaunched by Marvel Comics in March 2011 with an entirely different storyline. Now starring Samantha Rey, a 16-year-old South Carolina girl who awakens one day to find herself branded with a strange symbol, she finds herself thrust into a war across time.

Creative teams
Sigil was created by Mark Alessi and Gina M. Villa.

The original creative team consisted of writer Barbara Kesel, the Lai Brothers (Ben on pencils and Ray on inks), and Wil Quintana coloring. Over the years, this line-up changed several times.

Writers
Barbara Kesel
Mark Waid
Chuck Dixon
Mike Carey (under the relaunched Marvel Comics CrossGen imprint).

Pencillers
Ben Lai: His first penciling gig was with CrossGen and Sigil. He left with his brother and Sigil inker, Ray Lai, due to creative differences.
Kevin Sharpe: Also got his start on Sigil.
Steve McNiven: Pencilled a backup story, one of his earliest works as a penciller.
Scot Eaton
Dale Eaglesham
Leonard Kirk: First artist under the relaunched Marvel Comics CrossGen imprint.

Books
CrossGen published four trade paperback books containing the first part of the series:
 Sigil Volume 1: Mark of Power, 
 Sigil Volume 2: The Marked Man, 
 Sigil Volume 3: The Lizard God, 
 Sigil Volume 4: Hostage Planet, 

CrossGen also announced a further two books, but went bankrupt before they were published. Checker Books released them in July 2007:
 Sigil Volume 5: Death Match, 
 Sigil Volume 6: Planetary Union,

See also
Mark Alessi
CrossGen Comics
Negation War

2000 comics debuts
CrossGen titles
Science fiction comics